The common name Green Drake refers to one of several species of mayflies.

 Ephemera danica
 Ephemera guttulata or the Eastern Green Drake.